Lock Up Your Daughters is a 1959 horror film starring Bela Lugosi. Due to the lack of information on its production and release, it is uncertain whether it is a lost film or if it ever existed.

Plot
Details on the film’s plot are sketchy. A 1959 review of the film that appeared in the British trade journal Kinematography Weekly claimed that Lugosi played a "vampiric doctor who experiments on young women in order to bring back to life his lovely wife." The review states the film incorporates clips from films made earlier in Lugosi’s career, with footage featuring the Bowery Boys and "some of the great favourites of yesteryear."

Other reports on the film claim that Lugosi served as an on-screen host to a series of excerpts from his older films, while there are also assertions that Lock Up Your Daughters offered cash prizes for audience members who could identify the original films that provided excerpts for this production.

Production
Lock Up Your Daughters was produced by E.J. Fancey, using footage from 1940s horror films from Monogram Pictures starring Lugosi; and reportedly ran 50 minutes. Phil Rosen is credited as the film’s director. It was made in England and this was the only country where the film was seen. It appears to be a lost film, sought by the BFI.

The Kinematograph Weekly review is the only official acknowledgment that the film existed; there is no record of the film ever being theatrically released. To date, no prints or press materials on the film have surfaced.

See also
Bela Lugosi filmography

References

External links
 

1959 films
1959 horror films
Lost horror films
Lost American films
1950s lost films